On the Trapline is a children's picture book written by David Alexander Robertson, illustrated by Julie Flett, and published May 4, 2021 by Tundra Books. It won the 2021 Governor General’s Literary Award for Young People's Literature – Illustrated Books, and the 2022 TD Canadian Children’s Literature Award at the Canadian Centre for Children's Book Centre Awards on September, 29, 2022.

Awards 
The book won the 2021 Governor General's Literary Award for Young People's Literature – Illustrated Books at the 2021 Governor General's Awards, and the 2022 TD Canadian Children’s Literature Award at the Canadian Centre for Children's Book Centre Awards.

Reception 
On the Trapline received starred reviews from The Horn Book, Kirkus Reviews, and Publishers Weekly, as well as positive reviews from CM: Canadian Review of Materials, the Association of Children's Librarians of Northern California, Mutually Inclusive, the Canadian Children's Book Centre, and Booklist.

References

External links 
 David Robertson's On The Trapline
 David A. Robertson's picture book On the Trapline is a story of Indigenous language, family and empowerment

2021 children's books
Canadian children's books
American picture books
Governor General's Award-winning children's books
First Nations literature
Tundra Publishing titles